Thaddaeus Ropac are a group of galleries founded in 1981 by the Austrian gallerist Thaddaeus Ropac and has since specialized in International Contemporary Art. 

The group has galleries in Paris Marais, Paris Pantin, Salzburg and London.

History

Lienz and Salzburg
The gallery was founded 1981 as "Galerie Thaddäus J. Ropač/ Edition Rotha" in Lienz, Austria. It opened a gallery in Salzburg in 1983, first located at the Kaigasse 40, and then moved to Villa Kast in 1989, a 19th-century townhouse in Mirabell Garden. 

In March 2010, the gallery opened its "Salzburg Halle", an additional exhibition space within an industrial building close to the city centre of Salzburg.

Paris
In 1990, Thaddaeus Ropac opened his primary Paris space in the Le Marais quarter. 

The Pantin location opened in October 2012.

London
Thaddaeus Ropac opened a gallery branch in the Ely House in Mayfair, London, in Spring 2017.

Seoul
In mid-2021, Thaddaeus Ropac announced plans to open a new space in Seoul’s Hannam-dong district.

Work and current exhibitions
Since 2005, in partnership with the Robert Mapplethorpe Foundation, Ropac asked Hedi Slimane, Robert Wilson, Sofia Coppola and  Isabelle Huppert to act as guest curators and to select a series of the foundation's images for several gallery shows.

A selection of current gallery artists

 Cory Arcangel
 Jules de Balincourt
 Georg Baselitz
 Lee Bul (since 2007)
 Tony Cragg
 Richard Deacon
 Valie Export (since 2017)
 Sylvie Fleury
 Gilbert & George
 Adrian Ghenie (since 2015)
 Antony Gormley
 Alex Katz
 Anselm Kiefer
 Imi Knoebel
 Wolfgang Laib
 Jonathan Lasker
 Jason Martin
 Jonathan Meese
 Ron Mueck (since 2020)
 Jack Pierson
 Arnulf Rainer
 Tom Sachs
 David Salle
 Banks Violette
 Lawrence Weiner
 Erwin Wurm

In addition to living artists, Thaddaeus Ropac also handles the estates of the following: 
 Joseph Beuys (since 2018)
 Rosemarie Castoro (since 2019)
 Donald Judd (since 2018)
 Robert Mapplethorpe
 Robert Rauschenberg (since 2015)
 James Rosenquist (since 2017)
 Sturtevant
 Andy Warhol

External links

Thaddaeus Ropac, Dealer for Baselitz, Kiefer, Gilbert & George and Cragg (The Wall Street Journal, January 15, 2011)
Galerie Thaddaeus Ropac - Paris - EVENE
GALERIE THADDAEUS ROPAC | Fondation d'Entreprise Ricard
Galerie Thaddaeus Ropac Paris 3e Art culture paris,art culture
Galerie Thaddaeus Ropac - Gallery homepage at artnet.com
Erwin Wurm "Yes Biological" — Galerie Thaddaeus Ropac — Exposition — Slash Paris
Georg BASELITZ « Monumental sculptures, paintings and aquarelles », galerie Thaddaeus Ropac (exposition du 24 avril au 29 mai 2010)
Galerie Thaddaeus Ropac : Fine Arts Gallery Salzburg
Salzburg's Tourist Information Centre on Thaddaeus Ropac
Le Figaro - Guide Arts / Expositions - Galerie Thaddaeus Ropac
artalog.net- L'actualité des galeries d'Art - Galerie Thaddaeus Ropac

References

Contemporary art galleries in Austria
Contemporary art galleries in France